Kırıkkale Büyük Anadoluspor Kulübü is a Turkish football club located in Kırıkkale, Turkey.

History 
The club was founded under the name Türk Metal Gençlikspor in 1995 by the Türk Metal Sendikası, a Turkish metal-worker union. An amateur club for their early existence, they were promoted into the Turkish Regional Amateur League in 2011. The club again changed their name to 'Türk Metal Kırıkkalespor in June 2015. They won the 2015-16 Turkish Regional Amateur League, and were promoted into the TFF Third League for the first time.

Colours and badge 
The club colours are blue and red.

Current squad

Honours
Turkish Regional Amateur League: 2015-16

References

External links 
 TFF Profile

Football clubs in Turkey
Association football clubs established in 1995
1995 establishments in Turkey
Sport in Kırıkkale